The Reverend William Thomas Ross Flemington,  (October 11, 1897 – July 10, 1971) was president of Mount Allison University (1945 to 1962) and the first New Brunswick ombudsman (1967 to 1971).

He was principal chaplain overseas during World War II. In 1971 he was made a Companion of the Order of Canada "for his services as an educator, a theologian and public servant".

References
 
 
 

1897 births
1971 deaths
Canadian clergy
Canadian university and college chief executives
Companions of the Order of Canada
World War II chaplains